Tenerani (foaled April 14, 1944 in Italy) was a Champion Thoroughbred racehorse who raced in Italy and in England. Bred by Lydia & Federico Tesio, he was named for the Italian sculptor, Pietro Tenerani. His dam was Tofanella, a foundation broodmare for the Tesio's Dormello Stud in Dormelletto, Italy. Damsire Apelle, owned and bred by Tesio, was one of the first horses from Italy to meet with success in racing outside the county. Tenerani's sire, Bellini, was also bred and raced by Federico Tesio and whose wins included the 1940 Derby Italiano.

Trained by Federico Tesio, Tenerani was winner at age two in 1946, and in 1947 the Italian 3-Yr-Old Champion Colt. Sent to compete in England in 1948, he won the Goodwood Cup and the Queen Elizabeth Stakes, a precursor of the King George VI and Queen Elizabeth Stakes. Tenerani raced and won in Italy at age five in 1949 before being retired to stud duty. In 1951 he was sent to stand at stud in England where he most notably sired Ribot, widely regarded as one of the great horses in the history of Thoroughbred racing.

References

External links
 Tenerani's pedigree and partial racing stats
 June 1, 1959 Sports Illustrated article titled The Man, The Horse And The Deal That Made History

1944 racehorse births
Racehorses bred in Italy
Racehorses trained in Italy
Thoroughbred family 6-d